just A moment is the third studio album by the Japanese rock band Ling tosite Sigure released on May 13, 2009. It includes both of their previous singles moment A rhythm and Telecastic fake show.

Track listing 
All tracks written and composed by Toru "TK" Kitajima.

References

External links 
 Ling tosite sigure discography 

2009 albums
Ling Tosite Sigure albums